Denis McQuail (12 April 1935, London – 25 June 2017) was a British communication theorist, Emeritus Professor at the University of Amsterdam, considered one of the most influential scholars in the field of mass communication studies.

Biography
Denis McQuail was born in Wallington, London on 12 April 1935 to Irish immigrant parents Annie (née Mullan) and Christopher McQuail. After schooling at St Anselm's college in Birkenhead, where he showed an aptitude for languages, he spent his national service in the Intelligence Corps learning Russian and studied history at Corpus Christi College, Oxford. McQuail obtained his BA in Modern History from the University of Oxford in 1958, and the next year his MA in Public and Social Administration. He obtained his PhD in social studies from the University of Leeds in 1967 with the thesis, entitled Factors affecting public interest in television plays.

McQuail started his academic career in the UK. On 1 August 1977, he was appointed Professor at the University of Amsterdam, where on 6 November 1978 he spoke the inaugural lecture, entitled "The historicity of a science of mass media: time, place, circumstances and the effects of mass communication." After his early retirement on 1 January 1997, he was appointed Emeritus Professor. He was also Visiting Professor in the Department of Politics at the University of Southampton.

The Amsterdam School of Communication Research (ASCoR) established the Denis McQuail Award in his honour which is awarded each year to the best article advancing communication theory since 2006.

Work

Publications
McQuail published extensively in the field of political communication and communication theory. Best known is his contribution to the education of the public, concerning communication theory. His work has centred on explaining communication theories and their applications. He is adamant about informing the public on the benefits and dangers of mass communication.

In the early 1980s he and Dr. Sven Windahl published a book Communication Models. The book details basic communication models (Lasswell model, Shannon and Weaver's model, Gerbner's model), theories of media, audience-centered models, and mass media systems in general. In textbook style, the book outlines each topic: it is a compilation of existing communication theories with the author's own thoughts.

McQuail's next book, Mass Communication Theory, discusses in greater detail the mass communication concept. Specifically, it talks about the significance of mass media and how it affects the individual and society rather than focusing on the definitions of the models in general. "The three primary objectives: to update and take account of recent theory and research; enlargement, to reflect the continuing expansion of the field; clarification and improved presentation (pg. 13)". In Chapter 10, McQuail discusses the future of mass communication and states that it is either socially fragmenting or unifying. He makes several points on how the media needs to be socially responsible to be effective.

The sequel was Media Performance (1992). In it, previous theories are taken more for granted, and applied. He discusses at length the importance of an informed public. He states that the more aware a public is, the less likely it will be affected by media.

In 1993, communication scholars Denis McQuail and Sven Windahl referred to Lasswell's model as "perhaps the most famous single phrase in communication research." McQuail and Windahl also considered the model as a formula that would be transformed into a model once boxes were drawn around each element and arrows connected the elements. In 1995, Stanley Baran and Dennis Davis recognized it a verbal model of the communication process. In 2008, Greenberg and Salwen acknowledged that Lasswell's model of communication has been widely adopted, but expressed: "Although Lasswell's model draws attention to several key elements in the mass communication process, it does no more than describe general areas of study. It does not link elements together with any specificity, and there is no notion of an active process.

Freedom versus control
Denis McQuail believes the relations between media and society both have political and social-cultural aspects. Vital to the political aspect is the question of freedom and control.

The use and reception of media 
McQuail makes special mention in Mass Communication Theory of the difficulty that surrounds identifying specific uses of media, as well as the difficulty of understanding the reception that any specific medium may have. McQuail uses the medium of the television as an example and notes that despite the many changes and extensions that the occurred, the television is still primarily seen as a medium of family entertainment.

Selected publications
 McQuail, Denis (2010), McQuail's Mass Communication Theory (sixth edition)
 McQuail, Denis (ed.) (2002), McQuail's Reader in Mass Communication Theory. Sage: London
 McQuail, Denis and Karen Siune for the Euromedia Research Group (eds.) (1998), Media Policy: Convergence, Concentration and Commerce. Sage: London
 McQuail, Denis 1992, Media Performance: Mass Communication and the Public Interest. Sage: London

References

External links
 Wiki.media-culture.org.au
 "Perspectives on Mass Communication – A conversation with Denis McQuail", Ideas Roadshow, 2014

1935 births
2017 deaths
British technology writers
Communication theorists
Academic staff of the University of Amsterdam
Alumni of the University of Leeds
Academics from London
Alumni of Corpus Christi College, Oxford